Lee Wilkinson may also refer to the statistician Leland Wilkinson.

Lee Wilkinson (born Nottingham, England) is a popular British writer of over 30 romance novels in Mills & Boon since 1987, and is now publishing independently through the site "Lulu". Her latest romantic novel "Marley" is available through "Lulu".

Biography
Lee Wilkinson born in Nottingham, England, is an only child. She was educated at an all-girls school.

Lee married Dennis at 22. They had two children, a son and a daughter, and became grandparents four times over. Following the death of Dennis she still lives in their 300-year-old stone cottage in a Derbyshire village. After publishing 39 books with Mills and Boon over many years she has now started publishing independently using the internet publisher "Lulu".

Bibliography

Single novels
Motive for Marriage (1987)
Hong Kong Honeymoon (1991)
My Only Love (1992)
Joy Bringer (1992)
Lost Lady (1993)
Adam's Angel (1994)
That Devil Love (1994)
Blind Obsession (1995)
A Husband's Revenge (1996)
Ruthless! (1996)
Wedding Fever (1996)
The Secret Mother (1997)
First-class Seduction (1997)
The Right Fiance? (1998)
The Marriage Takeover (1999)
Marriage on Trial (1999)
Substitute Fiancee (2000)
The Determined Husband (2000)
A Vengeful Deception (2001)
Wedding on Demand (2001)
Marriage on the Agenda (2001)
Stand-in Mistress (2002)
Ryan's Revenge (2002)
The Venetian's Proposal (2002)
The Tycoon's Trophy Mistress (2003)
At the Millionaire's Bidding (2003)
One Night with the Tycoon (2004)
His Mistress by Marriage (2005)
The Carlotta Diamond (2005)
Kept by the Tycoon (2006)
The Bejewelled Bride (2006)
Wife by Approval (2007)
The Padova Pearls (2007)
Marley (2013)

Omnibus in collaboration
Amnesia (2000) (with Sandra Marton and Rebecca Winters)
After Office Hours... (2006) (with Helen Brooks and Jessica Steele)
Red-Hot Revenge (2006) (with Jacqueline Baird and Cathy Williams)
Italian Proposals (2007) (with Kate Hardy and Sarah Morgan)
Married to a Millionaire (2007) (with Sandra Field and Margaret Mayo)

Sources
Lee Wilkinson's webpage at Harlequin Enterprises Ltd's website

External links
Lee Wilkinson's webpage at Fantastic Fiction's website

Living people
English romantic fiction writers
Year of birth missing (living people)
Women romantic fiction writers
English women novelists